Les Films Séville (Formerly René Malo Vidéo, Malofilm and Malofilm Home Video) was a Canadian film distributor company. First based on Saint-André Boulevard in 1983, it moved its operations in 1993 to Saint Laurent Boulevard, as the Canadian branch of Republic Pictures Home Video and Turner Home Entertainment, distributing releases from the two companies into Canada. The company distributed Entertainment One’s movies in Quebec.

In 1999, Malofilm was renamed Les Films Séville, after a hostile merger with Industry Entertainment, and was acquired by Entertainment One in 2007. On May 31, 2000, Behaviour Worldwide was sold to MDP's old management, which changed its name back to MDP Worldwide.

History 
The company was founded in 1983 by chairman and CEO René Malo in Montreal, Quebec. 

In 1995, Malofilm acquired Desclez Productions and Megatoon Entertainment Group (MEG).

In 1996, Malofilm acquired ReadySoft Incorporated, a well known Canadian software company. Also that year, it bought out California film studio Image Organization for $1.8 million.

In 1997, Malofilm changed its name to Behaviour Communications, after Malo was forced to retire from the company for health reasons. On March 26, 1998, it bought out MDP Worldwide for $19.3 million, and changed its name to Behaviour Worldwide.

In 1999, Behaviour Interactive was sold to Rémi Racine and some investors, and was renamed Artificial Mind & Movement Inc. (A2M) the following year (it later returned to the name Behaviour Interactive in 2010).

In 1999, Behavior Communications was renamed Les Films Séville, after a hostile merger with Industry Entertainment, and was acquired by Entertainment One in 2007. On May 31, 2000, Behaviour Worldwide was sold to MDP's old management, which changed its name back to MDP Worldwide.

In 2012, Les Films Séville merged with Alliance Vivafilm, which was acquired by Entertainment One, and the new entity kept the name Les Films Séville.

From April 2014, the distribution of films under the Alliance Vivafilm brand was stopped in favor of distribution solely under the Les Films Séville brand.

Entertainment One shut the division down in June 2022. Months later, its back catalogue was acquired by Immina Films, a new independent company launched by former Séville president Patrick Roy.

References 

Defunct film and television production companies of Canada
Film distributors of Canada
Film production companies of Canada
Companies based in Montreal
Mass media companies established in 1987
Mass media companies disestablished in 2022
1987 establishments in Quebec
2022 disestablishments in Canada